Shuka (also Shukadeva ) is a rishi (sage) in Hinduism. He is the son of the sage Vyasa and the main narrator of the scripture Bhagavata Purana. Most of the Bhagavata Purana consists of Shuka reciting the story to the king Parikshit in his final days. Shuka is depicted as a sannyasi, renouncing the world in pursuit of moksha (liberation), which most narratives assert that he achieved.

Legends

Birth
According to the Hindu epic Mahabharata, after one hundred years of austerity by Vyasa, Shuka was churned out of a stick of fire, born with ascetic power and with the Vedas dwelling inside him, just like his father. As per Skanda Purana, Vyasa had a wife, Vatikā (also known by the name Pinjalā), daughter of a sage named Jābāli. Their union produced a son, who repeated everything what he heard, thus receiving the name Shuka (lit. Parrot).

Other texts including the Devi Bhagavata Purana also narrate the birth of Shuka but with drastic differences. Vyasa was desiring an heir, when an apsara (celestial damsel) named Ghritachi flew in front of him in form of a beautiful parrot. He discharges his semen, which fell on some sticks and a son developed. This time, he was named Shuka because of the role of the celestial parrot.

A slightly different story is told in other scriptures. One day, the god Shiva prepares to narrate the secret of immortality to his consort-goddess Parvati, at her behest. He orders all other beings in the vicinity to leave. Shiva closes his eyes and instructs Parvati to make a humming sound to indicate her attention. At the very moment of Shiva's instruction, a parrot is born from its egg and becomes an audience to the secret divine conversation. Shiva starts his narrative and Parvati makes the sound, but mid-way falls asleep. The parrot, however, continues to make the humming sound so Shiva continues. After completely revealing the secret, Shiva finds Parvati asleep and realizes that another being has eavesdropped. He notices the parrot and chases to kill him. The tiny parrot flies into a nearby forest and enters into the womb of Vyasa’s wife through her mouth when she was yawning. Shiva arrives and demands that the parrot comes out, but Vyasa persuades him to leave the parrot as if he truly knew the secret, it was no use killing it as it would be immortal. Then Vyasa asks the parrot to come out, but it refuses, stating that if he comes out, he will be termed as Vyasa’s son and he does not want any attachment, and wants only moksha. This continues for 12 years and it makes Vyasa’s wife bear the pain, as the parrot is growing in her womb as a child for all those years. Vyasa prays to the god Vishnu to help his wife. Vishnu, who was present on the earth as Krishna, arrives. Krishna assures the parrot that no one would kill him and he would be incapable of attachment and eligible for moksha. The parrot then comes out in a human form and is named “Shuka” (Sanskrit for “parrot”).

Life

The Mahabharata also recounts how Shuka was sent by Vyasa for training to King Janaka, who was considered to be a Jivanmukta or one who is liberated while still in a body. Shuka studied under the guru of the gods (Brihaspati) and Vyasa. Shuka asked Janaka about the way to liberation, with Janaka recommending the traditional progression of the four ashramas, which included the householder stage. After expressing contempt for the householder's life, Shuka questioned Janaka about the real need for following the householder's path. Seeing Shuka's advanced state of realization, Janaka told him that there was no need in his case.

Stories recount how Shuka surpassed his father in spiritual attainment. Once, when following his son, Vyasa encountered a group of celestial nymphs who were bathing. Shuka's purity was such that the nymphs did not consider him to be a distraction, even though he was naked, but covered themselves when faced with his father. Shuka is sometimes portrayed as wandering about naked, due to his complete lack of self-consciousness.

Death
Shuka told a brief version of the Bhagavata Purana to the Kuru king Parikshit, who was destined to die after seven days due to a curse.

A place called Shukachari is believed to be the cave of Shuka, where he disappeared in cave stones as per local traditions. Shuka in Sanskrit means parrot and thus the name is derived from the large number of parrots found around the Shukachari hills. Shukachari literally means abode of parrots in the Sanskrit language.

See also

 Bhagavad Gita
 Hindu mythology
 Krishna

Further reading

 Shuka. In: Wilfried Huchzermeyer: Studies in the Mahabharata. Indian Culture, Dharma and Spirituality in the Great Epic. Karlsruhe 2018, pp. 164–178

References

Rishis
Vaishnavite religious leaders
Characters in the Bhagavata Purana